Al-Raba al-Gharbi is a sub-district located in Sanhan and Bani Bahlul District, Sana'a Governorate, Yemen. Al-Raba al-Gharbi had a population of 23690 according to the 2004 census.

References 

Sub-districts in Sanhan and Bani Bahlul District